is a Japanese wrestler. He competed in the men's Greco-Roman 52 kg at the 1968 Summer Olympics.

References

External links
 

1945 births
Living people
Japanese male sport wrestlers
Olympic wrestlers of Japan
Wrestlers at the 1968 Summer Olympics
Sportspeople from Shizuoka Prefecture
20th-century Japanese people